The S. Paulo was a Brazilian single-engine, single seat aircraft, was the first airplane to fly in Latin America.

Design and development
It was the first airplane with a totally national project manufactured in Brazil. Lavaud began work on it in 1908, and the engine was cast and machined in São Paulo. The skeleton of the aircraft was made of sarrafo de pinho and peroba, and the outer shell was varnished with cretonne. The propeller was made by carpenter Antônio Damasso, using jequitibá wood.

It flew for the first time in January 1910, in Osasco. The event was followed by dozens of people, documented by Estadão. It flew for 6 seconds over a distance of 103 meters, at a height of 3 or 4 meters.

Specifications

References

Further reading
 Alain Cerf, Dimitri Sensaud de Lavaud : Un ingénieur extraordinaire, Editions du Palmier, 2011. . 
 Susana Alexandria, 1910 - O Primeiro Voo do Brasil, Ed. Aleph, São Paulo, 2010. .

1910s Brazilian experimental aircraft
1910s Brazilian civil aircraft
Single-engined tractor aircraft
Monoplanes
Aircraft first flown in 1910
High-wing aircraft